Janet Lee and Wynne Prakusya were the defending champions, but both didn't participate in 2004.

Svetlana Kuznetsova and Elena Likhovtseva won the title.

Seeds

  Liezel Huber /  Ai Sugiyama (semifinals)
  Svetlana Kuznetsova /  Elena Likhovtseva (winners)
  María Vento-Kabchi /  Angelique Widjaja (first round)
  Janette Husárová /  Conchita Martínez (final)

Results

Draw

References

External links
 wtatour.com website
 iftennis.com website

Qatar Ladies Open
Qatar Ladies Open
2004 in Qatari sport
Tennis in Qatar
Sport in Doha